Jennifer Galais (born 7 March 1992 in Lyon) Is a French athlete, specialising in the sprints.

Career  
She won the bronze medal 200 meters during the 2011 European Junior Championships, at Tallinn in Estonia, behind British Jodie Williams and Dutch Jamile Samuel.

On 10 July 2016, she was part of the team that placed 6th in the finals of the 4 × 100 m relay at the 2016 European Athletics Championships, in 43.05 seconds.

Prize list

Records

References

External links  
 
 Profile at French Athletics Federation

1992 births
Living people
Athletes from Lyon
French female sprinters
Athletes (track and field) at the 2016 Summer Olympics
Olympic athletes of France
Athletes (track and field) at the 2018 Mediterranean Games
Mediterranean Games gold medalists for France
Mediterranean Games medalists in athletics
Olympic female sprinters
21st-century French women